The 2014–15 Ukrainian Cup  is the 24th annual season of Ukraine's football knockout competition.
The decision on a schedule of competitions for clubs of the First and Second League and amateur leagues composition was confirmed on 23 July 2014 at a session of Central Council of the Professional Football League of Ukraine.

Team allocation 

Thirty nine teams entered into the Ukrainian Cup competition. There were several changes implemented for the competition.
Prior to each round's draw, starting from the competition proper (round of 32) seedings were introduced according to the team's ranking according to their respective league competition. The Round of 16, quarter finals and semi finals will be played as two legged fixtures.

Distribution

Round and draw dates

Competition schedule

Preliminary round (1/64)

In this round entered 4 clubs from the First League, 8 clubs from the Second League and the finalists of the Ukrainian Amateur Cup. The round matches were played on 6 August 2014.

Notes:
  Makiyivvuhillya Makiyivka did not participate in the competition due to not having enough funds to travel outside the area of where war conditions exist in Donetsk.

 The match was played at the Stadium of the National University of State Taxation Service of Ukraine in Irpin.

 The match was played 7 August 2014.

Round of 32

In this round all 14 teams from the 2014–15 Ukrainian Premier League, 11 clubs from 2014–15 Ukrainian First League (except Dynamo-2 Kyiv) and 7 winners from the Preliminary round enter this stage of the competition which also includes 4 teams from the 2014–15 Ukrainian Second League and last season's Ukrainian Amateur Cup finalist. The draw for this round was held 13 August 2014 at the House of Football in Kyiv.  The round matches are scheduled to be played on 23 August 2014.

{{football box collapsible |id="" 
|date=
|round=
|time=
|team1= Stal Alchevsk (1L) 
|score= w/o|report=  
|team2=  (1L) Stal Dniprodzerzhynsk
|goals1= 
|goals2= 
|stadium=
|attendance= 
|referee= N/A
}}

Notes:
 The match between FC Ternopil and FC Oleksandriya has been brought forward one day due to schedule conflict as two games are scheduled at Ternopil City Stadium (the other being between Nyva and Vorskla).

 Мatch to be played at the Stadium of the National University of State Taxation Service of Ukraine in Irpin, since Chaika's home ground Kozak Arena in Petropavlivsk Borschahivka, Kyiv-Sviatoshyn Raion is unsuitable due to its artificial surface.

 Match to be played on 24 August, Independence Day by mutual agreement of the teams.

 Match to be played on 24 August, Independence Day by mutual agreement of the teams.

 Stal Alchevsk withdrew from the competition. Stal Dniprodzerzhynsk advanced to the next round of the competition.

Round of 16

In this round 13 teams from the 2014–15 Ukrainian Premier League, 3 clubs from 2014–15 Ukrainian First League. The round matches are played in two legs. The first leg will be played from the 25 September through on 28 September and the second leg was scheduled to be played 29 October 2014.  The draw for this round was held 26 August 2014 at the House of Football in Kyiv.

First leg

Second leg
On 8 October 2014, the Administration of the Premier League approved dates and times for second leg games of the round of 16.

Shakhtar won 9–2 on aggregate.

Dnipro won 4–1 on aggregate.

Olimpik won 6–0 on aggregate.

Dynamo won 2–0 on aggregate.

Vorskla won 4–2 on aggregate.

3–3 on aggregate. Chornomorets won 4–2 on penalties.

3–3 on aggregate. Metalist won on away goals.

Zorya won 2–1 on aggregate.Notes: Originally scheduled on 28 October 2014, game Shakhtar – Poltava was moved to earlier date.

 Originally scheduled on 30 October 2014, games Dnipro – Volyn, Dynamo – Karpaty, and Metalist – Hoverla were moved to earlier dates.

Quarterfinals
In this round enter the eight winners from the previous round. All the teams are from the Premier League. The draw was held at the House of Football in Kyiv on 31 October 2014. The first leg matches were scheduled to be played on 3 December 2014, but due to weather conditions the Premier League has rescheduled the match to the spring pending confirmation by the Football Federation of Ukraine. On 10 February 2015 the Premier League administration approved dates and times of the first leg.

First legNotes:' Originally scheduled on 4 March 2015, game Chornomorets – Dnipro was postponed.

Second legOlimpik won 1–0 on aggregate.Dynamo won 4–1 on aggregate.Shakhtar won 3–0 on aggregate.Dnipro won 5–0 on aggregate.Semifinals
In this round enter the four winners from the previous round. All the teams are from the Premier League. The draw was held at the House of Football in Kyiv on 9 April 2015.

First leg

Second legDynamo won 4–1 on aggregate.Shakhtar won 2–1 on aggregate.''

Final

Top goalscorers
The competition's top ten goalscorers including qualification rounds.

See also 
2014–15 Ukrainian Premier League
2014–15 Ukrainian Premier League Reserves and Under 19
2014–15 Ukrainian First League
2014–15 Ukrainian Second League
2014–15 UEFA Europa League

Notes

References

Cup
Ukrainian Cup
Ukrainian Cup seasons